Echidne may refer to:

 Echidna (mythology), the "Mother of All Monsters" in Greek mythology
 Echidne (snake), a synonym for Bitis, a genus of African vipers